José Giro (born 12 November 1955) is a Spanish cross-country skier. He competed at the 1980 Winter Olympics, the 1984 Winter Olympics and the 1988 Winter Olympics.

References

1955 births
Living people
Spanish male cross-country skiers
Olympic cross-country skiers of Spain
Cross-country skiers at the 1980 Winter Olympics
Cross-country skiers at the 1984 Winter Olympics
Cross-country skiers at the 1988 Winter Olympics
Place of birth missing (living people)